Enrique Gómez (1916–1955) was a Spanish screenwriter and film director. Gómez was a Catalan from Barcelona, who directed eleven feature films between 1945 and 1954, including the bullfighting saga The Party Goes On (1948), before his career was ended by his early death.

Selected filmography
 The Party Goes On (1948)
 Persecution in Madrid (1952)

References

Bibliography 
 Bentley, Bernard. A Companion to Spanish Cinema. Boydell & Brewer 2008.

External links 
 

1916 births
1955 deaths
Spanish film directors
Spanish male screenwriters
People from Barcelona
20th-century Spanish screenwriters
20th-century Spanish male writers